Whitchurch Town railway station was a station on the Didcot, Newbury and Southampton Railway in England. It served the town of Whitchurch, Hampshire, between 1885 and 1960.

History
The Didcot, Newbury and Southampton Railway (DN&S) was opened in stages. The section between Enborne Junction (to the west of ) and Winchester was formally opened on 1 May 1885, public services beginning on 4 May; among the original stations was one named Whitchurch.

Whitchurch was already served by one railway station on the LSWR which survives to this day. The DNSR had a choice of connecting to the LSWR and building a station nearby to aid interchange traffic. However, it decided to build the station further south, closer to the town.

Accidents and incidents
On 23 September 1954, a freight train overran signals and was derailed by trap points.
On 12 February 1960, a freight train overran signals and was derailed by trap points.

Facilities
The station was relatively large compared to others on this section of the line including a larger station building on the northbound platform and a subway to link the two platforms. There was also a long passing loop and three sidings complete with a large goods shed. The station also boasted a water crane and water tower.

Working
The DN&S was worked by the Great Western Railway (GWR), and at the 1923 Grouping, the DN&S was absorbed by the GWR. The GWR had other stations also named Whitchurch, and to distinguish them, most were renamed: this one became Whitchurch (Hants) on 1 July 1924.

Temporary closure
Like other stations on the former DN&S line, Whitchurch (Hants) station was closed temporarily on 4 August 1942 so that the line could be upgraded for wartime freight trains; it reopened on 8 March 1943.

Final closure
Following the nationalisation of the railways in 1948, British Railways renamed the station Whitchurch Town on 26 September 1949, a name which it retained until closure to passengers on 7 March 1960. Goods services continued, but these ceased as from 6 May 1963.

Routes

Notes

References

External links
Whitchurch Station on navigable 1947 O.S. map

Disused railway stations in Hampshire
Former Great Western Railway stations
Railway stations in Great Britain opened in 1885
Railway stations in Great Britain closed in 1942
Railway stations in Great Britain opened in 1943
Railway stations in Great Britain closed in 1960
Whitchurch, Hampshire